Meitus may refer to:

Robert Meitus, American guitarist, singer, and lawyer
Yuliy Meitus (1903–1997), Ukrainian composer